Diocese (or Bishopric) of Toamasina may refer to :

 the present Anglican Diocese of Toamasina
 the precursor of the Roman Catholic Archdiocese of Toamasina, which was called the Diocese of Toamasina